William Oliver Davies (born 29 December 1972) was an English cricketer. He was a left-handed batsman and wicket-keeper who played for Shropshire. He was born in Shrewsbury and educated at Belvidere School, Shrewsbury.

Davies, who represented Shropshire in the Minor Counties Championship between 1998 and 2000, made a single List A appearance for the side, during the 1999 NatWest Trophy, against Hampshire Cricket Board. From the opening order, he scored 18 runs.

He has played cricket at club level for Wroxeter.

References

External links
William Davies at Cricket Archive

1972 births
Living people
English cricketers
Shropshire cricketers
Sportspeople from Shrewsbury